Tân Sơn is a rural district of Phú Thọ province in the Northeast region of Vietnam.

See also
Xuân Sơn National Park

Districts of Phú Thọ province